Agon is a 22-minute ballet for twelve dancers with music by Igor Stravinsky. It was choreographed by George Balanchine. Stravinsky began composition in December 1953 but was interrupted the next year; he resumed work in 1956 and concluded on April 27, 1957. The music was premiered in Los Angeles at UCLA's Royce Hall on June 17, 1957, conducted by Robert Craft. Stravinsky himself conducted the sessions for the work's first recording the following day on June 18, 1957. Agon was first performed on stage by the New York City Ballet at the City Center of Music and Drama on December 1, 1957. 

The composition's long gestation period covers an interesting juncture in Stravinsky's composing career, in which he moved from a diatonic musical idiom to one based on twelve-tone technique; the music of the ballet thus demonstrates a unique symbiosis of musical idioms. The ballet has no story, but consists of a series of dance movements in which various groups of dancers interact in pairs, trios, quartets, etc. A number of the movements are based on 17th-century French court dances – saraband, galliard and bransle. It was danced as part of City Ballet's 1982 Stravinsky Centennial Celebration.

The title of the ballet, Agon, is a Greek word which means “contest”, “protagonist” but also “anguish” or “struggle”.

Form
Stravinsky laid out the ballet in a duodecimal form, with four large sections each consisting of three dances. A Prelude and two Interludes occur between the large sections, but this does not fundamentally affect the twelve-part design because their function is caesural and compensatory:
I. 
 Pas-de-quatre (4 male dancers)
 Double pas-de-quatre (8 female dancers)
 Triple pas-de-quatre (4 male + 8 female dancers)
Prelude
II. (First pas-de-trois: 1 male, 2 female dancers)
Sarabande-step (1 male dancer)
Gaillarde (2 female dancers)
Coda (1 male, 2 female dancers)
Interlude
III. (Second pas-de-trois: 2 male, 1 female dancers)
Bransle simple (2 male dancers)
Bransle gay (1 female dancer)
Bransle double (2 male, 1 female dancers)
Interlude
IV.
Pas-de-deux (1 male, 1 female dancer)
Four Duos (4 male, 4 female dancers)
Four Trios (4 male, 8 female dancers)

Instrumentation 
Agon is scored for a large orchestra consisting of 3 flutes (3rd doubling piccolo), 2 oboes, English horn, 2 clarinets, bass clarinet, 2 bassoons, contrabassoon, 4 horns, 4 trumpets, 3 trombones (2 tenor, 1 bass), harp, piano, mandolin, timpani, tom-tom, xylophone, castanets, and strings.  At no point does the entire orchestra play a tutti.  Each section is scored for a different combination of instruments.

Music 
This was not the first composition in which Stravinsky employed serial techniques, but it was the first in which he used a twelve-tone row, introduced in the second coda, at bar 185. Earlier in the work, Stravinsky had employed a seventeen-tone row, in bars 104–107, and evidence from the sketches suggests a close relationship between these two rows. The Bransle Double is based on a different twelve-tone series, the hexachords of which are treated independently. Those hexachords first appear separately in the Bransle Simple (for two male dancers) and Bransle Gay (for solo female dancer), and are then combined to form a twelve-tone row in the Bransle Double. These three dances together constitute the second pas-de-trois.

Original cast
Todd Bolender
Barbara Milberg
Barbara Walczak
Roy Tobias
Jonathan Watts
Melissa Hayden
Diana Adams
Arthur Mitchell

Italy
When Agon was performed in Italy in 1965, Stravinsky was particularly pleased with the performance of mandolinist Giuseppe Anedda. "Bravo Mandolino!" shouted Stravinsky at Anedda and caught up with him to congratulate him and shake his hand.

References

Sources

Further reading
 Joseph, Charles M. 2002. Stravinsky and Balanchine: A Journey of Invention. New Haven: Yale University Press. .
 Macaulay, Alastair. November 25, 2007. "50 Years Ago, Modernism Was Given a Name: Agon". The New York Times.

External links 
Agon, Balanchine Trust
"The Bransles of Stravinsky's Agon : A Transition to Serial Composition", by Bonnie S. Jacobi

1957 ballet premieres
1957 compositions
Ballets by George Balanchine
Ballets by Igor Stravinsky
New York City Ballet repertory
New York City Ballet Stravinsky Centennial Celebration
Twelve-tone compositions